A Country Cupid is a 1911 American short silent drama film directed by D. W. Griffith and starring Blanche Sweet. A print of the film survives.

Cast
 Blanche Sweet as Edith
 Edwin August as Jack
 Edna Foster as Billy
 Joseph Graybill as The Half-Wit
 Kate Bruce as Edith's Mother
 Claire McDowell as The Half-Wit's Mother
 Frank Evans as Jack's Father
 Alfred Paget as A Farmer
 Edward Dillon as Among Students
 Robert Harron as Among Students

See also
 List of American films of 1911
 D. W. Griffith filmography
 Blanche Sweet filmography

References

External links

1911 films
American black-and-white films
1911 drama films
1911 short films
Films directed by D. W. Griffith
American silent short films
Silent American drama films
1910s American films